Zinjibar ( Zinjibār) is a port and coastal town in south-central Yemen, the capital of Zinjibar District and the Abyan Governorate.  It is located next to the Wadi Bana in the Abyan Delta. From 1962 to 1967, it was the administrative capital of the Fadhli Sultanate, although the royal residence remained at the former capital of Shuqrah. At the time of the 2004 census, Zinjibar's population numbered 19,879 inhabitants. The town supports a small seaside resort and fishing industry. Cotton (Gossypium barbadense) grown in the area is brokered in the market.

History
Zinjibar was a long-established trading center for commerce with the Far East. However, in 1163 (559 AH) the town was burned and destroyed by Abdel Nabi Ali Mahdi Yoosuf. It was rebuilt as is evidenced by 15th century Yemeni pottery at the Mazda (القريات) archaeological site, but was destroyed again in tribal warfare. In the 19th century, Fadhli Sultan Hussein bin Ahmed bin Abdullah re-established the town, also was exiled to Pune India and in the early 1920s was ordered to be returned, Sultan Saleh Abdullah bin Hussein bin Ahmed was exiled by the British to Zinzibar thous upon his return he renamed the town Zinjibar in honor of his exile.

The name Zinjibar is from Persian compound Zang-bâr (زنگبار), meaning "coast of the dark-skinned". The name Zanzibar is also of the same root.

2011 revolt

In May 2011, the town was reported as overtaken by Islamist militants as part of the 2011 Yemeni uprising. On June 12, 2012, the militants were driven out by the Yemeni army. On the same date, the neighboring town of Jaʿār, 15 kilometers or 9 miles to the north, was also retaken by the government forces.

2015 conflict

Soldiers allied with the Houthis took over Zinjibar in late March 2015, driving out troops and fighters loyal to President Abd Rabbuh Mansur Hadi. The city became a target for the airstrikes of a multinational coalition intervening in Yemen on Hadi's behalf. On 2 December 2015, Ansar al-Sharia captured Zinjibar, along with Jaʿār.

2016 conflict

In early May 2016, AQAP fighters withdrew from the city of Zinjibar and Jaar after negotiation with Hadi loyalists. Since then, it has repeatedly withdrawn and returned. On 14 August, the cities were fully captured by pro-government forces which dislodged the militants from them.

Notes

Populated places in Abyan Governorate
Populated coastal places in Yemen